Scott Dam may refer to:

W. Kerr Scott Dam and Reservoir, in North Carolina
Scott Dam, impounding Lake Pillsbury in California